The Lancia 2000 (Tipo 820) is a series of automobiles produced by Lancia between 1971 and 1975. It was the last vehicle designed by Lancia engineers before the marque's acquisition by Fiat in 1969. The Lancia 2000 was a direct evolution of the Lancia Flavia, which it replaced.

The 2000 sedan
The 2000 sedan kept the central part of the body (roof, doors, interior) and the entire drivetrain (except for some improvements to the fuel injection) of its predecessor, the second series of the Flavia.

The most significant changes were made to the front and rear of the body, where the designers modernised the styling of its predecessor. In particular, the tail was squared and simplified, and the nose lost its separate air intake and headlamp nacelles. The mechanics retained most of the Flavia's specifications including the front-wheel drive, boxer engine, independent suspension, and disc brakes all around, with vacuum assist and split-circuits (called "Super duplex" by Lancia).

The 2000 used the 1991 cc 4-cylinder boxer engine, available in either carburetted form  or with fuel-injection . The latter abandoned the previously used Kugelfischer mechanical system in favor of a more reliable Bosch D-type electronic system. Bosch-equipped cars are distinguished by an "i.e." badge on the grille, signifying 'iniezione elettronica' ("electronic injection"). The transmission (produced by ZF) was a 4-speed manual-type for the 2000 equipped with a carburetor, and a manual 5-speed for the fuel-injected 2000. Since the 2000 was given a flagship role for Lancia (following in the footsteps of the prestigious Flaminia), the 2000 was given a high standard of finishes (fine wood for the dashboard and velvet or leather upholstery) and standard or optional equipment including hydraulically operated power steering (also manufactured by ZF), air conditioning, electric windows and sun blinds.

Because of the 2000s high production costs, Fiat was not in favor of putting the model into production, despite it being ready for production in 1969, which delayed its launch. But in the absence of any other new Lancia flagship models being ready, the 2000 was nonetheless launched in 1971. The 2000 was considered by many fans of the marque to be "the last real Lancia" due to the high build quality that the later models (Beta and Gamma) lacked. It was produced until 1974 with a total of 14,319 examples being made.

The 2000 and 2000 HF Coupé
The Lancia 2000 and 2000 HF Coupé were an evolution of the Series II Flavia Coupé. The car's bodyshell was designed and made by Pininfarina. The interior was also designed by Pininfarina and bears a striking resemblance to that of the Ferrari 330 GT. The cosmetic changes to the 2000 Coupé were largely confined to a new grille (matte black instead of chrome) with headlamps incorporated into the now wider intake, new bumpers (with rubber strips on the HF), and the tail was shorn of its vestigial tailfins, with a raised and squared decklid.

The interior did not undergo significant changes, being merely a refinement of the previous design. The powerplant was adopted from the 2000 sedan and available in two states of tune: carburetted on the 2000 Coupé, Bosch electronic fuel injection and engine management on the 2000 HF. The HF was recognizable by the body-side rub-strip, wooden Nardi steering wheel, and magnesium alloy wheels by Cromodora. Both versions had a 5-speed manual transmission with a dog-leg gearbox arrangement.

The Lancia 2000 and 2000 HF Coupés were technologically advanced for the day with features such as a 5-speed transmission, power assisted steering and electronic fuel injection on the 2000 HF. They are very well appointed with polished stainless steel brightwork, as opposed to chromed mild steel.

The 2000 and 2000 HF Coupé were the last cars designed by Lancia before Fiat took control of the company in 1969. The cars do not suffer the corrosion problems associated with later generation Lancias and are generally regarded as being more resistant than contemporaries from other Italian manufacturers.

Engine 
This improvement, however, was never publicized by Lancia because the marketing department believed that their targeted customers would less favorably respond to a campaign that emphasized power and performance rather than quality, technical sophistication and riding comfort.

Engine specifications

Gallery

Production

References

External links
 Lancisti.net - An Information Exchange and Support Community for Lancia Owners and Enthusiasts
 Lancia Motor Club (UK)

2000
Sedans
Coupés
Cars introduced in 1971
Front-wheel-drive vehicles
Cars powered by boxer engines